The meaning of the term phosphoryl varies, depending on the branch of scientific discipline.

In the branches mentioned above, the "phosphoryl" and phosphate groups are sometimes abbreviated by the letter "P", or represented by a symbol of encircled letter "P". "Phosphoryl" groups are covalently bonded by a single bond to an organic molecule, phosphate group(s) or another "phosphoryl" group(s), and those groups are sp3 hybridized at the phosphorus atom. The term "phosphoryl" in the mentioned branches is usually used in the description of catalytic mechanisms in living organisms. The "phosphoryl" group plays a central role in phosphorylation. In biochemical reactions involving phosphate groups (e.g. adenosine triphosphate), a "phosphoryl" group is usually transferred between the substrates by the "phosphoryl transfer reactions" (see phosphorylation). Examples of molecules containing those groups in biology, biochemistry and biomedicine are adenosine monophosphate (AMP), adenosine diphosphate (ADP), adenosine triphosphate (ATP), phosphocreatine (PCr) and DNA.

Contrary to biology, biochemistry and biomedicine branches, in organic and inorganic chemistry branches, and in the branche of chemical nomenclature (see IUPAC), the correct name for the  group is not "phosphoryl", but phosphonato, and the correct name for the  group is phosphono, and the term phosphoryl correctly refers to the trivalent >P(=O)− group. Example of molecules containing that trivalent phosphoryl group are phosphoryl chloride, methylphosphonyl dichloride and phosphoramide.

A phosphoryl group should not be confused with a phosphate group.

References

Phosphorus compounds
Functional groups